West Northamptonshire is a unitary authority area covering part of the ceremonial county of Northamptonshire, England, created in 2021. By far the largest settlement in West Northamptonshire is the county town of Northampton. Its other significant towns are Daventry, Brackley and Towcester; the rest of the area is predominantly agricultural villages though it has many lakes and small woodlands and is passed through by the West Coast Main Line and the M1 and M40 motorways, thus hosting a relatively high number of hospitality attractions as well as distribution centres as these are key English transport routes. Close to these is the leisure-use Grand Union Canal.

The district has remains of a Roman town Bannaventa, with relics and finds in the main town museums, and its most notable landscape and the mansion is Althorp.

History
West Northamptonshire was formed on 1 April 2021 through the merger of the three non-metropolitan districts of Daventry, Northampton, and South Northamptonshire, it absorbed the functions of these districts, plus those of the abolished Northamptonshire County Council.

In March 2018, following financial and cultural mismanagement by the cabinet and officers at Northamptonshire County Council, the then Secretary of State for Local Government, Sajid Javid, sent commissioner Max Caller into the council, who recommended the county council and all-district and borough councils in the county be abolished, and replaced by two unitary authorities, one covering the West, and one the North of the county. These proposals were approved in April 2019. It meant that the districts of Daventry, Northampton and South Northamptonshire were merged to form a new unitary authority called West Northamptonshire, whilst the second unitary authority North Northamptonshire consists of the former Corby, East Northamptonshire, Kettering and Wellingborough districts.

The council uses the former Northamptonshire County Council's offices at One Angel Square, 4 Angel Street, Northampton as its headquarters, but also continues to use the offices inherited from the three former district councils at Northampton Guildhall (from Northampton Borough Council), The Forum in Towcester (from South Northamptonshire District Council) and Lodge Road in Daventry (from Daventry District Council).

Council

Elections for a shadow authority were due to be held on Thursday 7 May 2020 but were postponed due to the COVID-19 pandemic. These elections were held on 6 May 2021 with the Conservatives winning an overall majority.

The Council comprises 93 councillors elected across 31 wards. As a result of the 2021 elections, the Conservatives hold 66 seats, the Labour Party hold 20, the Liberal Democrats hold 5 and there are 3 independent councillors.

Demographics

Population 
The West Northamptonshire population was estimated to be around 406,733 people in 2020, in 2011, off of previous administrative boundaries, the population of the West Northamptonshire area was around 375,101 people, with it being 345,589 people in 2001.

Gender 
In 2020, there was around an estimated 202,004 men and 204,729 women.

Ethnicity

Age structure

Settlements and parishes
For a county-wide list for Northamptonshire see List of places in Northamptonshire

Abthorpe, Adstone, Althorp, Arthingworth, Ashby St Ledgers, Ashton, Aston le Walls, Astrop, Aynho
Badby, Barby, Blakesley, Blisworth, Boddington, Boughton, Brackley, Bradden, Brafield-on-the-Green, Braunston,  Brington, Brixworth, Brockhall, Bugbrooke, Byfield
Caldecote, Canons Ashby, Castle Ashby, Chacombe, Chapel Brampton, Charlton, Charwelton, Chipping Warden, Church Brampton, Church Stowe, Clay Coton  Clipston, Cogenhoe, Cold Ashby, Cold Higham, Cosgrove, Coton, Cottesbrooke, Courteenhall, Creaton, Crick, Croughton, Culworth
Daventry,  Deanshanger, Denton, Dodford, Draughton
East Farndon, East Haddon, Easton Neston, Edgcote, Elkington, Evenley, Everdon, Eydon
Farthinghoe, Farthingstone, Flore, Fawsley
Gayton, Grafton Regis, Grange Park, Great Brington, Great Oxendon, Greatworth, Greens Norton, Grimscote, Guilsborough
Hackleton, Hanging Houghton, Hannington, Harlestone, Harpole, Hartwell, Haselbech, Hellidon, Helmdon, Hinton-in-the-Hedges, Holcot, Holdenby, Hollowell
Kelmarsh, Kilsby, King's Sutton, Kislingbury
Lamport, Lilbourne, Litchborough, Little Brington, Little Houghton, Long Buckby, Lower Catesby
Maidford, Maidwell, Marston St. Lawrence, Marston Trussell, Middleton Cheney, Milton Malsor, Moreton Pinkney, Moulton
Naseby, Nether Heyford, Newbottle, Newnham, Northampton, Norton
Old, Old Stratford, Overthorpe, Overstone
Passenham, Pattishall, Paulerspury, Pitsford, Potterspury, Preston Capes
Quinton
Radstone, Ravensthorpe, Roade, Rothersthorpe
Scaldwell, Shutlanger, Sibbertoft, Silverstone, Slapton, Spratton, Stanford-on-Avon, Staverton,  Stoke Bruerne, Sulby, Sulgrave, Syresham
Teeton, Thenford, Thornby, Thorpe Mandeville, Tiffield, Towcester
Upper Catesby, Upper Heyford, Upper Stowe
Wappenham, Walgrave, Warkworth, Watford, Weedon Bec, Weedon Lois, Welford, Welton, West Haddon, Weston, Whilton, Whiston, Whitfield, Whittlebury, Wicken, Winwick, Woodend, Woodford Halse
Yardley Gobion, Yardley Hastings, Yelvertoft

See also
2019–2023 structural changes to local government in England
2021 West Northamptonshire Council election
North Northamptonshire, another district created in Northamptonshire in April 2021.

References

External links
 West Northamptonshire Council

 
 Unitary authority districts of England
 Local government districts of the East Midlands
 Local government in Northamptonshire